Vitali Aleksandrovich Glushchenko (born 17 March 1985) is a former Russian professional football player.

Club career
He played two seasons in the Russian Football National League for FC Lada Togliatti and FC Chernomorets Novorossiysk .

External links
 
 

1985 births
Living people
Russian footballers
Association football midfielders
FC Lada-Tolyatti players
FC Chernomorets Novorossiysk players
FC Nika Krasny Sulin players
FC Orenburg players
FC Dynamo Stavropol players
FC SKA Rostov-on-Don players